Meteora (before 2018: Kalampaka) is a municipality in the regional unit of Trikala in the Thessaly region in Greece. Its seat is the town Kalampaka.

The municipality Meteora was formed as the municipality Kalampaka at the 2011 local government reform by the merger of the following 8 former municipalities, that became municipal units:
Aspropotamos
Chasia
Kalabaka
Kastania
Kleino
Malakasi
Tymfaia
Vasiliki

In 2018 it was renamed to "Municipality of Meteora". The municipality has an area of 1,658.280 km2.

References 

Populated places in Trikala (regional unit)
2018 establishments in Greece
Municipalities of Thessaly